The Davis–Adcock Store is a historic general store located at Wilbon, North Carolina, a crossroads north of Fuquay-Varina, in Wake County, North Carolina. The building was constructed in 1906, and is a one-story, frame, gable-front building, with a standing-seam metal roof and a stepped-parapet false front.  The community store served not only as a local distribution center for goods and services, but also as a center of community social life.  The building also housed the
local post office from 1906 until 1925.

It was listed on the National Register of Historic Places in September 2006.

See also
 List of Registered Historic Places in North Carolina

References

Commercial buildings on the National Register of Historic Places in North Carolina
Commercial buildings completed in 1906
Buildings and structures in Wake County, North Carolina
National Register of Historic Places in Wake County, North Carolina
1906 establishments in North Carolina